Eknath Shinde was sworn in as the Chief Minister of Maharashtra on 30 June 2022, on resignation of his predecessor Uddhav Thackeray. Shinde leads a government consisting of his Shiv Sena party and Bharatiya Janata Party.

Formation
After the 2019 Maharashtra elections, Shiv Sena broke its pre-poll alliance with BJP. Instead, it formed a government with NCP and Congress. Uddhav Thackeray became the Chief Minister, and Shinde was the public works and urban development minister. In June 2022, alongside several Shiv Sena legislators, Shinde withdrew from the Thackeray government. Amidst a political crisis, Thackeray resigned. A day after the resignation, Shinde was sworn in, with support from his faction of Shiv Sena, BJP, and other smaller parties.

Vote of confidence
The Legislative Assembly held a vote of confidence in the Shinde government on 4 July 2022.

Council of Ministers

Cabinet Ministers

By Departments
An alphabetical list of all the departments of Maharashtra Government with terms :
Cabinet Ministers

District Wise break up

Guardian Ministers

References

Shiv Sena
2022 in Indian politics
S
Cabinets established in 2022
2022 establishments in Maharashtra
Current governments